Ivan Ira Esme Morris (29 November 1925 – 19 July 1976) was an English writer, translator and editor in the field of Japanese studies.

Biography
Ivan Morris was born in London, of mixed American and Swedish parentage to Edita Morris and Ira Victor Morris (son of diplomat Ira Nelson Morris and grandson of meat-packer Nelson Morris). He studied at Gordonstoun, before graduating from Phillips Academy. He graduated with magna cum laude at Harvard University and received a doctorate at the SOAS University of London, specializing in Oriental languages. As an intelligence officer for the U.S. Navy, Morris was one of the first interpreters sent into Hiroshima after the dropping of the atomic bomb.

Morris wrote widely on modern and ancient Japan and translated numerous classical and modern literary works. He personally knew writer Yukio Mishima and translated some of his writings. Morris' book The Nobility of Failure is dedicated to Mishima's memory. His translation of The Pillow Book Sei Shonagon was probably his most significant translation from Classical Japanese, and his The World of the Shining Prince, a description of the Heian court culture at the time of The Tale of Genji, is probably his most important single scholarly work.

Morris joined the faculty of Columbia University in 1960 and was chairman of the department of East Asian languages and cultures from 1966 to 1969. In 1966 he was elected a Fellow of St Antony's College, Oxford. He helped founding Amnesty International USA and was the first chair of its board of directors from 1973 to 1976. 

Ivan Morris died of heart failure in Bologna, Italy, on 19 July 1976.

Personal life
Morris was married three times. His second wife was Japanese ballet dancer Ayako Ogawa, his third wife Japanese writer Nobuko Uenishi.

Selected works

As writer
 Nationalism and the Right Wing in Japan: A Study of Postwar Trends, Oxford University Press, 1960
 The World of the Shining Prince: Court Life in Ancient Japan, Alfred A. Knopf, 1964
 Dictionary of Selected Forms in Classical Japanese Literature, Columbia University Press, 1966
 The Tale of Genji Scroll, Kodansha, 1971
 The Nobility of Failure: Tragic Heroes in the History of Japan, Holt, Rinehart and Winston, 1975

As translator
 The Crazy Iris, by Masuji Ibuse, Encounter, Vol. 6 no. 5, 1956
 As I Crossed a Bridge of Dreams, by Sarashina Nikki, The Dial Press, 1971
 The Pillow Book of Sei Shōnagon, Oxford University Press, 1967
 The Journey, by Jirō Osaragi, Charles E. Tuttle, 1967
 Life of an Amorous Woman, by Ihara Saikaku, Unesco/New Directions Books, 1963
 The Temple of the Golden Pavilion, by Yukio Mishima, Alfred A. Knopf, 1959
 Fires on the Plain, by Shōhei Ōoka, Martin Secker & Warburg, 1957
 The Priest of Shiga Temple and His Love, by Yukio Mishima, in: Death in Midsummer and Other Stories, New Directions Publishing Corporation, 1966
 Swaddling Clothes, by Yukio Mishima, in: Death in Midsummer and Other Stories, New Directions Publishing Corporation, 1966

As editor
 Modern Japanese Stories, Charles E. Tuttle, 1962
 Thought and Behaviour in Modern Japanese Politics, by Masao Maruyama, Oxford University Press, 1963
 Japan, 1931–45: Militarism, Fascism, Japanism?, Heath, 1963
 The Pillow-Book Puzzles, Bodley Head, 1969
 Madly Singing in the Mountains: an Appreciation and Anthology of Arthur Waley, Walker, 1970

References

External links
 

1925 births
1976 deaths
Columbia University faculty
English people of German-Jewish descent
English people of Swedish descent
Harvard University alumni
Japanese–English translators
British Japanologists
Yukio Mishima
People educated at Gordonstoun
20th-century translators
Morris family (meatpacking)
British expatriates in the United States